Kangavar County (Šahrestâne Kangâvar) is in Kermanshah province, Iran. The capital of the county is the city of Kangavar. At the 2006 census, the county's population was 80,215 in 19,825 households. The following census in 2011 counted 81,051 people in 22,665 households. At the 2016 census, the county's population was 76,216 in 23,253 households.

Administrative divisions

The population history and structural changes of Kangavar County's administrative divisions over three consecutive censuses are shown in the following table. The latest census shows two districts, five rural districts, and two cities.

References

 

Counties of Kermanshah Province